Daliu (大柳 unless otherwise noted) could refer to the following locations in China:

 Daliu, Anhui, town in Nanqiao District, Chuzhou
 Daliu, Henan (大刘镇), town in Yuanhui District, Luohe
 Daliu, Shandong, town in Ningjin County
 Daliu Township, Gansu, in Liangzhou District, Weiwu
 Daliu Township, Hubei, in Yunyang District, Shiyan, Hubei